The Joint Analysis and Lessons Learned Centre (JALLC) is a NATO body located in Monsanto (Lisbon), Portugal.

The Joint Analysis and Lessons Learned Centre was commissioned on 2 September 2002. Its mission is to serve as NATO's centre for performing joint analysis of operations, training, exercises and experimentation, including establishing and maintaining an interactive managed NATO Lessons Learned Database. The JALLC is also responsible for producing the NATO Joint Analysis Handbook and the NATO Lessons Learned Handbook, for hosting the NATO Lessons Learned Conference and for organizing the NATO Lessons Learned Staff Officers Course at SWEDINT. 

In 2010, the JALLC established the JALLC Advisory and Training Team to assist NATO, NATO/partner nations/organizations to develop or improve their lesson learning and information sharing capability for the mutual benefit of the Alliance. Also, the NATO Lessons Learned Portal was launched to complement the NATO Lessons Learned Database with an area further enabling sharing of lessons learned information.

The JALLC, as a member of Supreme Allied Command Transformation (ACT), feeds the results of joint analysis work and lessons learned back into the transformation network. JALLC is one of three joint organisations in the ACT structure, the others being the Joint Warfare Centre (JWC) (Stavanger) and Joint Force Training Centre.

The Joint Analysis and Lessons Learned Centre shares a site with the Portuguese Air Force Operational Command (Comando Operacional da Força Aérea).

References

External links
Joint Analysis and Lessons Learned Centre 

2002 establishments in Portugal
Organizations established in 2002
Analysis
Organisations based in Lisbon

Military installations in Portugal
Portugal and NATO